Justin Drescher (born January 1, 1988) is a former American football long snapper that played eight seasons in the National Football League (NFL). He played college football at Colorado. He was signed by the Atlanta Falcons as an undrafted free agent in 2010. He was a member of the New Orleans Saints for seven seasons.

Professional career

Atlanta Falcons
Drescher was signed by the Atlanta Falcons as an undrafted free agent following the 2010 NFL Draft on April 26, 2010. He was waived prior to the start of training camp on June 15.

New Orleans Saints
Drescher was signed by the New Orleans Saints on November 22, 2010, after long snapper Jake Ingram was waived by the team following a botched snap. Drescher played in six games for the Saints in 2010.

Drescher re-signed with the Saints on August 6, 2017. He was released by the Saints on August 30, 2017 after the team traded for Jon Dorenbos.

Arizona Cardinals
On October 10, 2017, Drescher signed with the Arizona Cardinals. On December 11, 2017, Drescher was released by the Cardinals after Aaron Brewer was ready to return from injured reserve.

References

External links
New Orleans Saints bio
Colorado Buffaloes football bio

1988 births
Living people
Players of American football from Colorado Springs, Colorado
American football long snappers
Colorado Buffaloes football players
Atlanta Falcons players
New Orleans Saints players
Arizona Cardinals players